Walker Duehr (born November 23, 1997) is an American professional ice hockey winger currently playing for the  Calgary Flames of the National Hockey League (NHL).

Playing career
Upon signing his NHL contract on April 13, 2021, Duehr became the first player from South Dakota to sign an NHL contract. In the following  season, he made his NHL debut with the Flames on November 14, against the Ottawa Senators and subsequently became the first South Dakotan to play at the NHL level.

Career statistics

Awards and honors

References

External links
 

1997 births
Living people
American men's ice hockey right wingers
Calgary Flames players
Calgary Wranglers players
Chicago Steel players
Minnesota State Mavericks men's ice hockey players
People from Sioux Falls, South Dakota
Sioux City Musketeers players
Stockton Heat players
Tri-City Storm players
Undrafted National Hockey League players
Minnesota State University, Mankato alumni